John Donnelly (born 8 March 1961) is a Scottish footballer, who played for Motherwell, Dumbarton, Leeds United, Partick Thistle, Dunfermline Athletic, East Fife and Stranraer.

References

External links

1961 births
Living people
Footballers from Glasgow
Scottish footballers
Association football midfielders
Scottish Football League players
English Football League players
Notts County F.C. players
Motherwell F.C. players
Dumbarton F.C. players
Leeds United F.C. players
Partick Thistle F.C. players
Dunfermline Athletic F.C. players
East Fife F.C. players
Stranraer F.C. players
Vale of Clyde F.C. players